Vladimir Lončarević (born 26 July 1960) is a Croatian literary historian, literary theorist, Croatist, essayist and publicist.

Biography 
Lončarević was born in Zagreb, where he graduated in Croatian studies from the Faculty of Humanities and Social Sciences in 1985. As a student he edited Jordan, a religious-cultural magazine. He was redactor and lector in the religious-philosophical magazine Obnovljeni život, as well as editor of the magazine Korijeni (Roots) of the Slovenian Croats published in Ljubljana. Returning to Croatia he worked in the Minister of Construction, Housing-Communal Works. He was also an auxiliary counselor in the Office of the President of the Republic. Later, he was university professor at the Faculty of philosophy and religious studies in Zagreb. His essays and literary criticisms were published in the literary revue Marulić. Lončarević earned his master's degree in Croatian with a dissertation about the life and work of Ljubomir Maraković and his connections with the Croatian Catholic movement.

He is a consultant for analytics and domestic politics of the Croatian president Kolinda Grabar-Kitarović. Lončarević is a regular columnist for Glas Koncila.

References

External links 
 List of scientific works in Hrčak - Portal of Croatian scientific and professional journals

Living people
1960 births
Writers from Zagreb
University of Zagreb alumni
Croatian essayists
Literary historians
Literary theorists
Croatian columnists